Slobodan Grujić (born July 24, 1973, in Novi Sad, Serbia, Yugoslavia) is a male Serbian table tennis player. He plays for Fenerbahçe TT since 2007 and also played for Novi Sad TT in Serbia and TTV RE-BAU Gönnern in Germany.

Major achievements
2004–05 Champions League Champion with TTV RE-BAU Gönnern
2005–06 Champions League Champion with TTV RE-BAU Gönnern
1 time 3rd place of European Championship
3 time Turkish Champion
4 times Yugoslavian Champion
2008–09 ETTU Cup Runner-up

References

External links
Player profile on fenerbahce.org
Team page on fenerbahce.org

Serbian male table tennis players
Fenerbahçe table tennis players
Table tennis players at the 1992 Summer Olympics
Table tennis players at the 1996 Summer Olympics
Table tennis players at the 2000 Summer Olympics
Table tennis players at the 2004 Summer Olympics
Olympic table tennis players of Serbia and Montenegro
Olympic table tennis players as Independent Olympic Participants
Sportspeople from Novi Sad
1973 births
Living people
Mediterranean Games gold medalists for Yugoslavia
Mediterranean Games silver medalists for Yugoslavia
Mediterranean Games bronze medalists for Yugoslavia
Competitors at the 1997 Mediterranean Games
Competitors at the 2001 Mediterranean Games
Competitors at the 2005 Mediterranean Games
Competitors at the 2009 Mediterranean Games
Mediterranean Games gold medalists for Serbia
Mediterranean Games bronze medalists for Serbia
Mediterranean Games medalists in table tennis